Cuba is an unincorporated community in the northwestern part of Montgomery Township, Owen County, in the U.S. state of Indiana. It lies near the intersection of County Road 150 West (a.k.a. Keeler Road) and County Road 600 North (a.k.a. Hale Hill Road), which is a community about ten miles north of the town of Spencer, the county seat of Owen County.  Its elevation is 722 feet (220 m), and it is located at  (39.3781008 -86.7980628).

History
Cuba was founded in 1851. A post office was established at Cuba in 1851, and remained in operation until it was discontinued in 1909.

Geography
Kaufman Cemetery is about two miles west of this community, and it is located on Bandy Road west off of County Road 325 West (a.k.a. Rattlesnake Road) at  (39.3661559 -86.8241745).

Cloyd Cemetery is about two miles southwest of this community, and it is located near the intersection of County Road 460 North (a.k.a. Clark Road) and County Road 325 West (a.k.a. Rattlesnake Road) at  (39.3619893 -86.8147297).

School districts
 Spencer-Owen Community Schools, including a high school.

Political districts
 State House District 46
 State Senate District 39

References

External links
  Roadside Thoughts for Cuba, Indiana

Unincorporated communities in Owen County, Indiana
Unincorporated communities in Indiana